Meshir 26 - Coptic Calendar - Meshir 28

The twenty-seventh day of the Coptic month of Meshir, the sixth month of the Coptic year. In common years, this day corresponds to February 21, of the Julian Calendar, and March 6, of the Gregorian Calendar. This day falls in the Coptic Season of Shemu, the season of the Harvest.

Commemorations

Martyrs 

 The martyrdom of Saint Perpetua and her companions

Saints 

 The departure of Saint Eustathius, Patriarch of Antioch

References 

Days of the Coptic calendar